Orophus tessellatus, the false leaf katydid, is a species of katydid native to Mexico, Central America, and South America. It is in the large subfamily Phaneropterinae within the tribe Amblycoryphini. Its coloring varies from brown to green, some with spots, mottling, or uniform in coloration. The ovipositor is approximate  in length. The species is characterized by the size of the forewings and their "dirty" coloring.

It was originally described in 1861 as Phylloptera (Orophus) tessellata. The holotype is a female from Oaxaca, Mexico. It is part of the Orophus tessellatus species group, which also contains the species Orophus andinus and Orophus conspersus.

References

Phaneropterinae
Orthoptera of North America
Orthoptera of South America
Insects described in 1861